Khalida Zahir (1927 –  2015) (also: Khalda) was one of the first female Sudanese doctors and women's rights activist.

Childhood and education
Zahir was born in Omdurman. She graduated from the Kitchener School of Medicine, at what later became the University of Khartoum, in 1952, along with Z Serkisiani.

Medical career
Khalida and Serkisiani were the first female doctors of medicine in Sudan.

Khalida treated poor people free of charge in her clinic. She became head of paediatrics at the Sudanese Ministry of Health. She retired in 1986.

Political activism
Khalida was the first female member of the student union in 1947 and she joined the peace negotiations in relation to southern Sudan the same year. Khalida was one of the few women who joined a political party in the 1940s. She founded the Young Women's Cultural Society with Fatima Talib in 1948. The first Sudanese women's organization, it provided education for women on health, reading and writing. She was among the founders of the Sudanese Women's Union (SWU) in 1952, an organization which campaigned for suffrage and labour rights. Khalida was elected president of SWU in 1958.

Death
Khalida died 9 June 2015.

References 

Sudanese pediatricians
1927 births
2015 deaths
Women pediatricians
Sudanese women
Sudanese women's rights activists
People from Omdurman
University of Khartoum alumni